The Uganda Registration Services Bureau (URSB) is a semi-autonomous government agency, established by Act of Parliament in 1998 in Uganda. URSB is responsible for civil registrations (including marriages and divorces but not including births, adoptions, or deaths), business registrations (setups and liquidations), registration of patents and intellectual property rights, and any other registrations required by law.

Locations
The headquarters of URSB are located at Georgian House, 5 George Street, in Kampala, the capital and largest city of Uganda. In addition, URSB maintains branch offices at the following locations:

 Posta Branch - Posta Uganda Main Office, Booths 2 & 3, Kampala Road, Kampala
 UIA Branch - UIA Offices, 2nd Floor, Twed Towers, Lumumba Avenue, Kampala
Nakivubo Branch - Sekaziga House Floor 1, Nakivubo Mews, Kampala
 Mbale Branch - Ministry of Justice and Constitutional Affairs, 3 Park Crescent, Mbale
 Mbarara Branch - 1 Kamukuzi Hill, Mbarara
 Gulu Branch – 6B Princess Road, Gulu
 Arua Branch – 42/44 Packwach Road, Arua

Overview
In 2015, URSB was awarded "global recognition for improved service delivery, client satisfaction, innovation and leadership", by Otherways Management Association Club, a France-based organisation.

One of the priority areas that URSB is working on is establishing a national registry of movable assets, also known as a "chattels registry", to enable micro, small, and medium businesses to borrow from the formal banking sector, which requires collateral.

In February 2016, URSB signed a memorandum of understanding (MoU) with the Directorate of Public Prosecutions and the Uganda Financial Intelligence Authority. The MoU was intended to ease the sharing of information between the three government agencies and reduce government bureaucracy. The ultimate goal is to cut down on the concealment of assets and illegal money laundering.

Administration

Board of directors

According to URSB's website on 21 January 2021, the members of the board of directors are:

 Francis Butagira - Mbarara (Chairman)
Caroline T Egesa - Kampala (Board Secretary)
 Ben Anyama - Adjumani Town Council
Moses Zziwa - Ministry of Finance, Planning & Economic Development, Kampala
Emmanuel Dombo
Christine Kaahwa - Ministry of Justice & Constitutional Affairs, Kampala
Abdul Kasule - Ministry of Trade, Industry and Co-operatives, Kampala
Swizin Mugyema
Mercy Kainobwisho - Registrar General & CEO of URSB, Kampala

Management

As of 21 January 2021, Mercy Kainobwisho serves as Registrar General; the Deputy Registrar Generals of URSB are Jane Okot P’Bitek Langoya (Registries) and Alfred Mugisha (Finance and Administration).

See also
Uganda Revenue Authority
Insurance Regulatory Authority of Uganda
Uganda Retirement Benefits Regulatory Authority
National Social Security Fund (Uganda)

References

External links 
Uganda Registration Services Bureau Website

Government agencies of Uganda
Economy of Uganda
Taxation in Uganda
Kampala Central Division
Government and personhood
Organizations established in 2004
Organisations based in Kampala
2004 establishments in Uganda